German submarine U-195 was a Type IXD1 transport U-boat which served in World War II. The submarine was laid down on 15 May 1941 at the DeSchiMAG AG Weser yard in Bremen as yard number 1041, launched on 8 April 1942, and commissioned on 5 September 1942 under the command of Korvettenkapitän Heinz Buchholz.

U-195 was one of two IX-D1 transport U-boats that had their forward torpedo tubes removed and the compartment converted into a cargo hold. (U-180 had been trialled originally with six diesel engines driving two propeller shafts, but overheating proved such a problem that these engines were removed and replaced with a pair of 2,200 hp MAN diesel engines). It is unclear if U-195 underwent the same engine history as U-180, but it seems likely.

Design
German Type IXD2 submarines were considerably larger than the original Type IXs. U-195 had a displacement of  when at the surface and  while submerged. She had two shafts and two  propellers.

U-195 was fitted with six  torpedo tubes (four fitted at the bow and two at the stern), 24 torpedoes, one  SK C/32 naval gun, 150 rounds, and a  SK C/30 with 2575 rounds as well as two  C/30 anti-aircraft guns with 8100 rounds. The boat had a complement of fifty-five.

Operational history

First patrol
U-195 departed Kiel on 20 March 1943 and sailed to the waters off South Africa where she sank two ships and damaged another.

The ship, a straggler from Convoy UGS-7 en route from Baltimore to Casablanca, was loaded with sugar, acid, flour, aircraft parts, vehicles, bulldozers and had twelve P-38 Lightning aircraft as deck cargo. The crew of 69 abandoned ship in five lifeboats. The U-boat then fired two more torpedoes which sank the vessel.

The crew of 71 abandoned ship in four lifeboats and a raft before the U-boat sank the ship with another torpedo.

On 12 May, the unescorted 6,797 GRT American merchant ship Cape Neddick was hit by two torpedoes. The vessel began to sink, and most of the crew abandoned ship in two lifeboats and three rafts. After more than an hour the master and six volunteers re-boarded the ship and got her under way, just as U-195 fired another torpedo, which missed. The next day, the ship returned to pick up the men in the boats and rafts, and on 16 May arrived safely at Walvis Bay, South Africa. U-195 arrived at Bordeaux on 23 July after a patrol lasting 126 days.

Second patrol
Now under the command of Oblt.z.S. Friedrich Steinfeldt, U-195 left Bordeaux in occupied France on 24 August 1944 and arrived at Batavia (now part of Indonesia), 127 days later on 28 December.

Amongst her cargo were parts of 12 dismantled V-2 rockets for the Japanese military.  also carried part of the same V-2 rocket consignment. Both U-boats arrived at Batavia in December 1944. These two U-boats are also thought to have carried Uranium oxide requested for Japan's atomic bomb project by General Toranouke Kawashima in July 1943. The signals requesting Uranium were part of the PURPLE decrypts which have since been declassified by the United States. U-195 head north to Brunei in order to refuel for the next journey.

Third patrol
U-195s final patrol involved an abortive attempt by several U-boats to sail back to Europe. Leaving Batavia on 19 January 1945 she sailed out into the Indian Ocean, south of Madagascar. There she refuelled U-boats of the Monsun Gruppe and then returned to Batavia on 4 March.

Imperial Japanese Navy
After Germany's surrender in early May 1945, U-195 was taken over by the Imperial Japanese Navy and was commissioned as I-506 on 15 July. The U-boat surrendered to the Allies at Batavia in August 1945, she was scuttled on 15 February 1946 and was broken up in 1947. Some members of the German crew were apprehended by Dutch military forces in Malang (East-Java) on 1 August 1947

Summary of raiding history

References

Bibliography

External links
 
 
 Submarine I-506: Tabular Record of Movement

German Type IX submarines
World War II submarines of Germany
World War II submarines of Japan
Foreign submarines of the Imperial Japanese Navy
U-boats commissioned in 1942
Indian Ocean U-Boats
1942 ships
Ships built in Bremen (state)
Maritime incidents in 1946
Scuttled vessels